Wild West Chronicles is an American television series, which airs on INSP. The historical docudrama series follows the life of Bat Masterson, a newspaper reporter that traveled the frontier during the late 1800s to uncover stories about the Wild West.

The show stars Jack Elliott as Masterson, with the first show airing in 2020. The first season was temporarily halted during COVID-19, before returning in 2021. A third season of the show is set to premiere on April 6, 2023. A fourth season of the show was greenlit in February 2023.

Plot
Once a feared lawman, the legendary Bat Masterson trades his sheriff's badge for a pen to chase stories instead of outlaws. Each week, the gunslinger-turned-newspaperman travels the frontier to chronicle the wildest stories of the Old West, meeting eyewitnesses who share their vivid memories of remarkable characters such as Wild Bill Hickok, Pearl Hart, Stagecoach Mary, Butch Cassidy, and Bass Reeves.

Episodes

Season 1 (2020-2021)

Season 2 (2022)

Reception
The Dove Foundation stated on its review of the first episode it "will draw you in to the life of the famous female western bandit, Pearl Hart."

References

2020s Western (genre) television series
2020s American television series debuts